"Baya al Ward" is a love ballad written by Elias Naher for Amal Hijazi's album of the same name. Released by Rotana Records, the song was a big hit, charting strongly throughout the Arab world.

Music video

The song describes a woman whose relationship has ended with her lover. Amal Hijazi plays the woman in the track's music video. Miserable at the start of the video, Hijazi is seen in the washroom cutting her hair with a pair of scissors. She faces the camera as the song begins. After cutting her hair up to her neck, she puts on her jacket and goes downstairs.

Hijazi drinks tea, then bends down to her blue convertible, smokes, and leaves in her car along a long, straight road. A thorny plant ravages her body as she drives, until her car crashes into a tree by a lake at the edge of a mountain. There she wakes up, with blood on her lips. Finally, Hijazi takes the path towards the lake.

Critical response

The song was successful throughout the Arab world, and received heavy airplay on the radio and on Rotana Records channels. The song topped charts and became one of the biggest-selling tracks of 2006.

References

Amal Hijazi songs
2006 singles
2006 songs